Ohio State Route 193 (SR 193, OH 193) is a north–south state highway in the northeastern portion of the U.S. state of Ohio.  Its southern terminus is at an interchange with I-680 in Youngstown, and its northern terminus is at OH 531 in North Kingsville.

Route description
Ohio Route 193 has a southern terminus at Interstate 680 in Youngstown, Ohio. It travels as a short freeway connecting to US 422. It then intersects US 422 and leaves the freeway onto a residential two-way street. It continues north past Interstate 80 as a four lane rural road. It crosses OH 82.

History
OH 193 was designated between 1967 and 1969 along a former portion of OH 170 from US 422 in Youngstown to its current northern terminus in North Kingsville. From US 422 to US 20 in North Kingsville, this route was the former OH 90 from 1926 to 1962.  The former OH 90 was then extended north to OH 531 in 1940.  Meanwhile, the freeway section of OH 193 between US 422 and its current southern terminus at I-680 was completed at around the same time that OH 193 was assigned.

A previous iteration of OH 193 existed between 1924 and 1940. In 1940, the entire alignment became certified as OH 18.

Junctions

References

External links

State Route 193 Endpoint Photos

193
Transportation in Mahoning County, Ohio
Transportation in Trumbull County, Ohio
Transportation in Ashtabula County, Ohio